No Holdin' Back is the fifth studio album by American country music singer Randy Travis. It was released on September 26, 1989, by Warner Bros. Records Nashville. Three singles were released from it, all of which charted on the Hot Country Songs charts: the Number One hits "It's Just a Matter of Time" and "Hard Rock Bottom of Your Heart", as well as the #2 hit "He Walked on Water". "It's Just a Matter of Time" was previously a Number One hit for Brook Benton in 1959 on the R&B charts, and for Sonny James in 1970 on the country charts. Glen Campbell also had a #7-peaking rendition of the song in 1986.

The track "Somewhere in My Broken Heart" was co-written by Billy Dean, who would later cut it for his 1990 album Young Man and release it as that album's third single. Also included is a cover of "Singing the Blues", a song originally recorded by Marty Robbins.

Track listing

Personnel

 Eddie Bayers - drums on "No Stoppin' Us Now"
 Matraca Berg - background vocals
 Dennis Burnside - piano
 Larry Byrom - acoustic guitar
 Mark Casstevens - acoustic guitar
 Carol Chase - background vocals
 Doug Clements - background vocals
 Jerry Douglas - Dobro
 Béla Fleck - banjo on "Hard Rock Bottom of Your Heart"
 Steve Gibson - electric guitar, 12-string electric guitar
 Doyle Grisham - steel guitar
 Sherilyn Huffman - background vocals
 David Hungate - bass guitar
 John Barlow Jarvis - piano
 Kirk "Jelly Roll" Johnson - harmonica on "He Walked on Water"
 Wendy Suits Johnson - background vocals
 Paul Leim - drums
 Steve Lindsey - synthesizer and Kurzweil Synthesizer on "It's Just a Matter of Time"
 Larrie Londin - drums
 Terry McMillan - harmonica, percussion
 Brent Mason - electric guitar
 Louis Dean Nunley - background vocals
 Mark O'Connor - fiddle
 Dean Parks - electric guitar solo on "It's Just a Matter of Time"
 Richard Perry - bass vocals on "It's Just a Matter of Time"
 Tom Roady - percussion
 Hargus "Pig" Robbins - piano
 Lisa Silver - background vocals
 Randy Travis - acoustic guitar, lead vocals
 Dianne Vanette - background vocals
 Cindy Richardson-Walker - background vocals
 Billy Joe Walker, Jr. - electric guitar
 Jack Williams - bass guitar
 Curtis Young - background vocals

Charts

Weekly charts

Year-end charts

Certifications

References

1989 albums
Randy Travis albums
Warner Records albums
Albums produced by Kyle Lehning